Charouz Racing System (CHRS, also was known as Lotus in World Series Formula V8 3.5) is a racing team from Czech Republic, created in 1985 by .

History 
In the 1980s, Charouz participated in the European Championship of Circuit Races' 1600 cc division in a Toyota Corolla. By 1992, they prepared cars for a special cup series for Ford Fiestas, Escort RS 2000s and Pumas.

Since 1998, Charouz has competed in the European Rally Championship, Slovak Championship and European Zone series.

When the A1 Grand Prix series debuted in 2005, Charouz managed the A1 Team Czech Republic. The team later took over management duties for A1 Team Brazil.

New for 2007 was the entrance into endurance racing with the Le Mans Series. Competing with a Lola-Judd prototype, the team finished the year fifth in their class championship, including a second-place finish at Valencia. For 2008 the team entered a cooperation with Aston Martin Racing and Prodrive, running a new Lola B08/60 coupe in the Le Mans Series and the 24 Hours of Le Mans. The B07/17 from 2007 was entered at Le Mans under the Charouz banner, but the car was run by Greg Pickett's Team Cytosport with help from Sam Hignett's Jota Sport, the same organization who prepared this car for Charouz in 2007.

In 2010 Charouz ran four cars in the Auto GP series.

In 2018, following the collapse of the World Series Formula V8 3.5, Charouz joined the FIA Formula 2 Championship, fielding Antonio Fuoco and Louis Delétraz, and collaborated with Ralf Schumacher's US Racing outfit in the ADAC Formula 4 championship. This saw the team claim two wins from Fuoco in Formula 2, including a double podium at the sprint race in Monaco, to finish sixth in the constructors' standings while claiming both the ADAC Formula 4 drivers' and constructors' titles with Lirim Zendeli.

In November 2018, it was announced that Charouz would serve as a junior team to the Sauber Formula One team from 2019 onwards. For 2019, the team expanded into the newly created FIA Formula 3 Championship, while continuing its collaboration with US Racing in ADAC Formula 4.

In December 2019, after a season competing as the Sauber Junior Team, Charouz revealed that it would revert to its former name for 2020.
Louis Delétraz and Pedro Piquet were the first drivers to be announced for the squad. Both drove for the Charouz Racing System in its third consecutive season in the FIA Formula 2 Championship.

For the 2021 season of the FIA Formula 2 Championship, Charouz initially ran with a lineup consisting of German David Beckmann and Brazilian Guilherme Samaia, with former Formula 3 driver Enzo Fittipaldi replacing David starting at the round in Monza.

Current series results

FIA Formula 2 Championship

In detail
(key) (Races in bold indicate pole position) (Races in italics indicate fastest lap)

FIA Formula 3 Championship

In detail
(key) (Races in bold indicate pole position) (Races in italics indicate fastest lap)

Former series results

Formula 3000

A1 Grand Prix

F3000 International Masters

 D.C. = Drivers' Championship position, T.C. = Teams' Championship position.

24 Hours of Le Mans

Le Mans Series

Formula Renault 3.5 Series

 The team competed as Gravity–Charouz Racing in 2011 and as Lotus in 2012-2015.

World Series Formula V8 3.5

The team competed as Lotus.

Auto GP

 The team competed as Gravity–Charouz Racing.

ADAC Formula 4

 Charouz Racing System competed under the name US Racing - CHRS.

Formula 4 UAE Championship

†Beckhäuser drove for Rasgaira Motorsports in round 5.
 Charouz Racing System competed under the name Cram Motorsport / Charouz Racing.

Timeline

Notes

References

External links 
 

Czech auto racing teams
A1 Grand Prix racing teams
24 Hours of Le Mans teams
European Le Mans Series teams
World Series Formula V8 3.5 teams
ADAC GT Masters teams
Auto racing teams established in 1985
1985 establishments in Czechoslovakia
FIA Formula 2 Championship teams
FIA Formula 3 Championship teams
Auto GP teams
International Formula Masters teams
International Formula 3000 teams